Elise Skinnehaugen (born 3 June 1996) is a Norwegian handball player for Molde Elite.

National team coach, Thorir Hergeirsson has been impressed with Skinnehaugen's performance so far this fall season, as she has scored many important goals for Storhamar HE, indicating we might see her in a national team squad in 2018.

Achievements 
Norwegian League
Silver medalist: 2018/2019, 2019/2020, 2020/2021
Bronze medalist: 2017/2018
Norwegian Cup:
Finalist: 2018, 2019, 2021

Individual awards 
 Eliteserien's "public favorite": 2018/2019

References

Norwegian female handball players
1996 births
Living people
Sportspeople from Hamar